This is a list of prisons within Tibet Autonomous Region province of the People's Republic of China. This list does not include detention centres, which are not classed as prisons in China.

References 

 

Buildings and structures in Tibet
Prisons
Tibet
Torture in China